Ontario Mills is a shopping and outlet mall located in Ontario, California, within the Los Angeles metropolitan area.  With 28 million annual visitors, it is one of the top shopping and tourist destinations in California. It is one of three Mills landmarks in California that are now managed by Simon Property Group since April 2007. Simon owns 50% of it. The Outlets at Orange and The Great Mall are the others. Ontario Mills was designed by the architectural firm, F+A Architects.

The mall is near the Ontario International Airport and Auto Club Speedway, as well as the interchange between the Ontario Freeway (Interstate 15) and the San Bernardino Freeway (Interstate 10), one of the busiest in Southern California.

Size
According to the mall's former owners, the Mills Corporation, it is the largest one-level shopping mall in Western North America (there are larger malls, but they have two or more levels). In addition, it is California's largest outlet and value retail shopping destination.

Like other Mills malls, Ontario Mills is divided into neighborhoods. This mall has the most out of the Mills malls with ten.

Tenants
Some of the mall's major tenants include Off 5th Saks Fifth Avenue, H&M, Skechers Factory Store, Nike Factory Store, Forever 21, Nordstrom Rack, Uniqlo, a 30-screen AMC Theatres megaplex, the dining and entertainment venue Dave & Buster's video game arcade, and the Ontario IMPROV comedy club.

Ontario Mills is home to many designer-label outlet stores, including Tory Burch, Ann Taylor, Ralph Lauren, Hugo Boss, DKNY, Tommy Hilfiger, Perry Ellis, Calvin Klein, Coach, Kate Spade, LACOSTE and Michael Kors. Other stores include GameStop, LEGO Store, The Disney Store Outlet, Tumi, Movado, J. Crew, ULTA Beauty, Express, and  Levi's.

The mall also has a large food court called "Market", formerly called "Big Food", with about 1,000 seats and tenants like Panda Express, Burger King, Chipotle Mexican Grill, Sbarro, Starbucks Coffee, and Cinnabon. Restaurants outside the food court include Rainforest Cafe, Market Broiler, and Blaze Pizza.

History
Ontario Mills opened to the public on November 14, 1996, across the highway from the site of the Ontario Motor Speedway (built on the site of the old speedway parking lot). Like all other Mills properties, it was first developed and once owned by the Mills Corporation. Ontario Mills is the first Mills landmark center to have the racetrack layout and themed neighborhoods.  On December 13, 1996, AMC Ontario Mills 30 opened, making it the largest theatre in the world at the time.

An IMAX-like UltraScreen theater and a California Welcome Center operated by the entrance near the food court until 2000, when it was replaced by the Ontario IMPROV comedy club, Market Broiler, and a Nike Factory Store. Ontario Mills was formerly home to a Vans Skate Park, which in early 2005 was closed and converted into Steve & Barry's. In 2009, Steve & Barry's and Virgin Megastore were closed due to their chains' liquidations. Sports Authority closed its  store in 2004 when the company merged with Gart Sports; Sports Authority then reopened in the mall next to the Nike Factory Store in 2012, but closed again in August 2016 due to Chapter 11 Bankruptcy of the company, leading to the liquidation of all stores; it is now occupied by Aki Home. The well-known Wolfgang Puck Cafe closed in early 2005 and was replaced by the Polo Ralph Lauren Factory Store. A Neiman Marcus Last Call opened in 2012 on the former Steve & Barry's, along with an expansion of the existing Forever 21 and Nordstrom Rack stores and a new renovated food court. Ontario Mills also had one of the few JCPenney 5 Star outlets in the country, but it closed after JCPenney liquidated them in 2013 and was replaced by Fashion Q in 2014. Bed Bath & Beyond moved its store out of the mall across the street into a new shopping center in 2015; Restoration Hardware opened an outlet store in the former Bed Bath & Beyond space in 2016, and an Ulta Beauty also opened that year at the mall. Neiman Marcus Last Call closed on December 31, 2016 and was replaced by the Skechers Factory Store. One of the former video game arcade tenants opened on July 20, 1997, GameWorks closed in July 2017 after 20 years in Ontario Mills and was replaced by the Under Armour Factory Store. On May 13, 2018 (Mother's Day), after opening the previous year, Toys R Us Outlet closed due to Chapter 11 Bankruptcy after the company announced they would be going out of business. 
The mall's first expansion opened in the former JCPenney 5 Star Outlet building in the Summer of 2016, including an expanded Tommy Hilfiger store, and new tenants including Uniqlo, The North Face, Coach, and a Blaze Pizza with an outdoor patio. A new mall entrance was also added to the area with a more contemporary and modernized look.

Like other premium outlet centers, Ontario Mills was built in an area that had ample land available. The development of the mall has since contributed to the further urbanization of the eastern Ontario area and adjacent cities.

Gallery

References

External links
 Ontario Mills
 Mills Corporation

Shopping malls established in 1996
Outlet malls in the United States
Simon Property Group
Ontario, California
Shopping malls in San Bernardino County, California